Rafał Kujawa (born 11 July 1988) is a Polish professional  footballer who plays as a forward for GKS Wikielec. He began his youth career at ŁKS Łódź, where he later made his professional debut during the 2007–08 season.

Career

Club
Kujawa made his Ekstraklasa debut for ŁKS Łódź in November 2007.

National team
He was a part of the Poland national under-21 football team.

References

External links 
 
 

1988 births
Living people
Footballers from Łódź
Polish footballers
Poland under-21 international footballers
ŁKS Łódź players
GKS Katowice players
Pelikan Łowicz players
Bruk-Bet Termalica Nieciecza players
OKS Stomil Olsztyn players
Polonia Warsaw players
GKS Bełchatów players
Ekstraklasa players
I liga players
II liga players
III liga players
Association football forwards